Lipwood Railway Bridge is a railway bridge carrying the Tyne Valley line between  and  across the River South Tyne near Lipwood in Northumberland.

History
The first bridge at Lipwood for the railway between Newcastle upon Tyne and Carlisle was designed by John Blackmore and originally built of timber; it was completed in 1838 but as the condition of the wood deteriorated it was replaced by the current iron-girder structure in 1866.

References

Railway bridges in Northumberland
Crossings of the River Tyne